Fernando Soler (born Fernando Díaz Pavia; 24 May 1896 – 25 October 1979) was a Mexican actor, director, screenwriter, and producer. He was considered one of the most important figures of the Golden Age of Mexican cinema. In his career spanning over sixty years, Soler appeared as an actor in more than one hundred motion pictures.

Early life
Fernando Soler was born in Saltillo, Coahuila as Fernando Díaz Pavía on 24 May 1896 to Domingo Díaz García and Irene Pavía Soler. He was the elder brother of Andrés Soler, Domingo Soler, Julián Soler, and Mercedes Soler. His family is known as the Soler Dynasty.

He was the uncle of the deceased actors Alejandro Ciangherotti and Fernando Luján.

Selected filmography
 When Do You Commit Suicide? (1932)
 Por mis pistolas (1938)
 Poor Devil (1940)
 El verdugo de Sevilla (1942)
 My Memories of Mexico (1944)
 The Great Madcap (1949)
 A Family Like Many Others (1949)
 Las tandas del principal (1949)
 Yo quiero ser tonta (1950)
 Poor But Honest (1973)

References

External links
 

1896 births
1979 deaths
Best Actor Ariel Award winners
Mexican male film actors
Mexican film directors
Mexican male screenwriters
Mexican film producers
People from Saltillo
Male actors from Coahuila
20th-century Mexican male actors
20th-century screenwriters